The Pakistan National Shipping Corporation (PNSC) is a Pakistani national flag carrier and is one of Government of Pakistan's most profitable state-owned entities, most recently having recorded its highest ever profit of PKR 5.6 billion under the chairmanship of Rizwan Ahmed. The Corporation is principally engaged in the business of shipping, including charter of vessels, transportation of cargo and providing commercial, technical, administrative, financial and other services to its subsidiaries and third parties.

The Chairman of PNSC is appointed by the Prime Minister of Pakistan and is usually a high-ranking civil servant or naval admiral. Officers who have served as Chairman PNSC include Pakistan Administrative Service bureaucrats Rizwan Ahmed and Shakeel Ahmed Mangnejo, Admiral Tauqir Hussain Naqvi, Admiral Yastur-ul-Haq Malik, Admiral Saeed Mohammad Khan and Admiral Mansurul Haq.

PNSC, headquartered in Karachi, is under the administrative control of the Federal Ministry of Maritime Affairs. A regional office based in Lahore caters to upcountry shipping requirements. The corporation also has an extensive overseas network of agents looking after its worldwide shipping business. The Pakistan Merchant Navy is the fleet of state-owned merchant vessels flying the flag of Pakistan National Shipping Corporation.

History

The Pakistan Merchant Navy was formed after independence in 1947 when Pakistan inherited a fleet of four privately owned cargo ships. The Ministry of Maritime Affairs, Mercantile Marine Department and Government Shipping Office established by the Government of Pakistan were authorized to flag the ships and also ensured that the vessels were seaworthy.

In 1963, the National Shipping Ordinance was promulgated and National Shipping Corporation (NSC) was established which procured its first used ship, M.V. Rupsa in 1965. The national fleet comprised some 53 vessels which were owned by 10 private shipping companies. The national fleet grew to 71 vessels before the separation of East Pakistan and its emergence as Bangladesh in 1971 when the number declined to 57 vessels after the separation.

On 1 January 1974, President of Pakistan Zulfiqar Ali Bhutto nationalized National Shipping Corporation (NSC) and Pakistan Shipping Corporation (PSC) and other private shipping companies. Nine private shipping companies with a total of 26 ships were nationalized. The national fleet strength increased to 51 vessels including 26 ships under the management of nine nationalized companies and 25 ships with the state-owned NSC. In 1977, 14 ships were inducted in the Pakistan Shipping Corporation (PSC) during the Fifth Five-Year Plan. Two years later, NSC and PSC were merged to form the Pakistan National Shipping Corporation (PNSC) which still remains the sole state-owned shipping corporation.

Later other nationalized companies were also merged into a single company as the Pakistan National Shipping Corporation, incorporated under the provisions of the Pakistan National Shipping Corporation Ordinance of 1979 and the Companies Ordinance of 1984, respectively. The total fleet strength increased to 60 ships with the induction of 14 vessels in the late 1970s and early 1980s. PNSC enjoyed a complete monopoly till the early 1990s when the shipping sector was deregulated by the Nawaz Sharif government.

Pakistan National Shipping Corporation subsidiary companies
 Bolan Shipping (Private) Limited
 Chitral Shipping (Private) Limited
 Hyderabad Shipping (Private) Limited
 Khairpur Shipping (Private) Limited
 Malakand Shipping (Private) Limited
 Multan Shipping (Private) Limited
 Sibi Shipping (Private) Limited
 Karachi Shipping (Private) Limited
 Lahore Shipping (Private) Limited
 Quetta Shipping (Private) Limited
 Shalamar Shipping (Private) Limited

Former company titles 

Muhammadi Steamship Company Limited was incorporated on 12 May 1947. In 1949, it became the first Pakistani shipping line to be publicly listed on the Karachi Stock Exchange.

Muhammadi House on McLeod Road (now I. I. Chundrigar Road) was the headquarters of the company.

The company was nationalized by the Government of Pakistan under then President Zulfikar Ali Bhutto. It was later merged with other Pakistani nationalized shipping companies to create the Pakistan National Shipping Corporation.

East & West Steamship Company was one of the oldest locally owned shipping line in Pakistan until it was nationalised in 1974. Its ship,  was the first ship ever registered at the newly established Port of Registry at Karachi in August 1948.  It was owned by the Cowasjee family. The company was restructured as the 'East and West Steamship Co. Ltd.' in 1961

The National Shipping Corporation (NSC) was established under the National Shipping Corporation Ordinance, 1963, with a view to provide efficient shipping services. The Corporation was managed by a Board of nine directors, out of which five including the Chairman, the Managing Director and the Financial Director were appointed by the Central Government and remaining four were elected by the share holders from each Province. The authorized capital of the Corporation was Rs. 250 million and the subscribed capital was to be Rs. 50 million. The share of Central Government in the capital was 25% and the balance of 75% was raised from the public in East and West Pakistan on the basis of parity.

In 1974 the Federal Government decided to take over the management and control of entire shipping in Pakistan, including NSC through promulgation of the Pakistan Maritime Shipping (Regulation and control) Ordinance, 1974 which later on became an Act. In September, 1976 the Federal Government established the Pakistan Shipping Corporation (PSC) under the Pakistan Shipping Corporation Act, 1976, to take charge of ten shipping companies and operate as a parallel corporation with the National Shipping Corporation (NSC).

Fleet

Muhammadi Steamship Company Limited

East & West Shipping Company

Pakistan National Shipping Corporation

Merchant Navy Rank Insignia of Deck Officers and Engineer Officers

See also

 List of ports in Pakistan
 Pakistan Marine Academy
 Government Shipping Office
 Shipping Master
 Merchant Navy
 Yastur-ul-Haq Malik
 Rizwan Ahmed
 Saeed Mohammad Khan
 Ministry of Maritime Affairs (Pakistan)

References

External links
Pakistan National Shipping Corporation
Pakistan Marine Academy
Mercantile Marine Department
Government Shipping Office
 Marine Academy Old Boys Association
 Pakistan Marine Academy on Facebook

Pakistan Navy
 
Government-owned companies of Pakistan
Companies listed on the Pakistan Stock Exchange
Pakistani companies established in 1971
Transport companies established in 1971
Ministry of Maritime Affairs (Pakistan)